The Stephen the Great Monument is a prominent monument in Chișinău, Moldova.

Description 
The monument to Stephen the Great was designed by architect Alexandru Plămădeală in 1923. It was erected near the main entrance of the Stephen the Great Park in Central Chișinău. The monument was completed in 1927 and opened on 29 April 1928 (to replace the monument to Alexander II of Russia, destroyed by the Romanian authorities in 1918). The total cost of the monument was 4.000.000 lei.

A few days before the 1940 Soviet occupation of Bessarabia and northern Bukovina, the monument was relocated to Vaslui, and its pedestal was blown up. On August 25, 1942, the monument was returned to Chișinău and taken back to Romania in 1944. In 1945, the Soviet authorities ordered the restoration of the monument to Chișinău. 

On 31 August 1989 the monument to Stephen the Great was returned to its original location, chosen by Alexandru Plămădeală in the 1920s. The initial inscriptions were restored. Flower-laying ceremonies are regularly performed at the pedestal of this monument on each national holiday and on days of official top- and high-level visits.

External links
 
 The Monument to Stephen the Great 
 The Monuments of Kishinev 

1927 sculptures
Monuments and memorials in Chișinău
1928 in Romania
Tourist attractions in Moldova
Bronze sculptures in Moldova